The 1985 NBL season was the seventh season of competition since its establishment in 1979. A total of 14 teams contested the league.

Regular season
The 1985 regular season took place over 18 rounds between 12 April 1985 and 18 August 1985.

Round 1

|- bgcolor="#CCCCFF" font size=1
!width=90| Date
!width=180| Home
!width=60| Score
!width=180| Away
!width=260| Venue
!width=70| Crowd
!width=70| Box Score

Round 2

|- bgcolor="#CCCCFF" font size=1
!width=90| Date
!width=180| Home
!width=60| Score
!width=180| Away
!width=260| Venue
!width=70| Crowd
!width=70| Box Score

Round 3

|- bgcolor="#CCCCFF" font size=1
!width=90| Date
!width=180| Home
!width=60| Score
!width=180| Away
!width=260| Venue
!width=70| Crowd
!width=70| Box Score

Round 4

|- bgcolor="#CCCCFF" font size=1
!width=90| Date
!width=180| Home
!width=60| Score
!width=180| Away
!width=260| Venue
!width=70| Crowd
!width=70| Box Score

Round 5

|- bgcolor="#CCCCFF" font size=1
!width=90| Date
!width=180| Home
!width=60| Score
!width=180| Away
!width=260| Venue
!width=70| Crowd
!width=70| Box Score

Round 6

|- bgcolor="#CCCCFF" font size=1
!width=90| Date
!width=180| Home
!width=60| Score
!width=180| Away
!width=260| Venue
!width=70| Crowd
!width=70| Box Score

Round 7

|- bgcolor="#CCCCFF" font size=1
!width=90| Date
!width=180| Home
!width=60| Score
!width=180| Away
!width=260| Venue
!width=70| Crowd
!width=70| Box Score

Round 8

|- bgcolor="#CCCCFF" font size=1
!width=90| Date
!width=180| Home
!width=60| Score
!width=180| Away
!width=260| Venue
!width=70| Crowd
!width=70| Box Score

Round 9

|- bgcolor="#CCCCFF" font size=1
!width=90| Date
!width=180| Home
!width=60| Score
!width=180| Away
!width=260| Venue
!width=70| Crowd
!width=70| Box Score

Round 10

|- bgcolor="#CCCCFF" font size=1
!width=90| Date
!width=180| Home
!width=60| Score
!width=180| Away
!width=260| Venue
!width=70| Crowd
!width=70| Box Score

Round 11

|- bgcolor="#CCCCFF" font size=1
!width=90| Date
!width=180| Home
!width=60| Score
!width=180| Away
!width=260| Venue
!width=70| Crowd
!width=70| Box Score

Round 12

|- bgcolor="#CCCCFF" font size=1
!width=90| Date
!width=180| Home
!width=60| Score
!width=180| Away
!width=260| Venue
!width=70| Crowd
!width=70| Box Score

Round 13

|- bgcolor="#CCCCFF" font size=1
!width=90| Date
!width=180| Home
!width=60| Score
!width=180| Away
!width=260| Venue
!width=70| Crowd
!width=70| Box Score

Round 14

|- bgcolor="#CCCCFF" font size=1
!width=90| Date
!width=180| Home
!width=60| Score
!width=180| Away
!width=260| Venue
!width=70| Crowd
!width=70| Box Score

Round 15

|- bgcolor="#CCCCFF" font size=1
!width=90| Date
!width=180| Home
!width=60| Score
!width=180| Away
!width=260| Venue
!width=70| Crowd
!width=70| Box Score

Round 16

|- bgcolor="#CCCCFF" font size=1
!width=90| Date
!width=180| Home
!width=60| Score
!width=180| Away
!width=260| Venue
!width=70| Crowd
!width=70| Box Score

Round 17

|- bgcolor="#CCCCFF" font size=1
!width=90| Date
!width=180| Home
!width=60| Score
!width=180| Away
!width=260| Venue
!width=70| Crowd
!width=70| Box Score

Round 18

|- bgcolor="#CCCCFF" font size=1
!width=90| Date
!width=180| Home
!width=60| Score
!width=180| Away
!width=260| Venue
!width=70| Crowd
!width=70| Box Score

Ladder

The NBL tie-breaker system as outlined in the NBL Rules and Regulations states that in the case of an identical win–loss record, the results in games played between the teams will determine order of seeding.

1Head-to-Head between Brisbane Bullets and Adelaide 36ers (1-1). Brisbane Bullets won For and Against (+19).

2Head-to-Head between Nunawading Spectres and Canberra Cannons (1-1) & For and Against (0). Nunawading Spectres won Overall Points Percentage (+0.90%).

3Illawarra Hawks won Head-to-Head (2-0).

Finals

Playoff bracket

There were two elimination finals, two semi-finals, and then one grand final. All three of these finals were sudden death. The top two teams of the regular season, the Brisbane Bullets and Adelaide 36ers, automatically qualified to host their respective Semi-finals.

Elimination Finals

|- bgcolor="#CCCCFF" font size=1
!width=90| Date
!width=180| Home
!width=60| Score
!width=180| Away
!width=260| Venue
!width=70| Crowd
!width=70| Box Score

Semi-finals

|- bgcolor="#CCCCFF" font size=1
!width=90| Date
!width=180| Home
!width=60| Score
!width=180| Away
!width=260| Venue
!width=70| Crowd
!width=70| Box Score

Grand Final

|- bgcolor="#CCCCFF" font size=1
!width=90| Date
!width=180| Home
!width=60| Score
!width=180| Away
!width=260| Venue
!width=70| Crowd
!width=70| Box Score

1985 NBL statistics leaders

NBL awards
Most Valuable Player: Ray Borner, Coburg Giants
Rookie of the Year: Mike McKay, Adelaide 36ers
Coach of the Year: Bob Turner, Canberra Cannons

All NBL Team

References

 
1985 in Australian basketball